The R429 road is a regional road in Ireland, located in County Laois and County Kildare.

References

Regional roads in the Republic of Ireland
Roads in County Kildare
Roads in County Laois